Dinara Safina was the defending champion in the Women's Singles event in the 2003 Idea Prokom Open, a Polish tennis competition. She retired in her quarter-final match against Anna Pistolesi.

Pistolesi won the title by defeating Klára Koukalová 6–2, 6–0 in the final.

Seeds
The first two seeds received a bye into the second round.

Draw

Finals

Top half

Bottom half

References

External links
 Official results archive (ITF)
 Official results archive (WTA)

Orange Warsaw Open
2003 WTA Tour